Kostas Tournas (born 23 September 1949,) is one of the pioneers of modern Greek rock. He is a singer and composer of many hits in the '70s including Ti Na Mas Kanei I Nychta (What Can The Night Do For Us).

He shaped Greek rock music in the late '60s along with groups such as Socrates Drank the Conium, Peloma Bokiou, Nostradamos and Hexadactylos. He is also one of the founder members of the pioneering Greek rock group Poll along with Robert Williams.

Tournas along with Robert Williams and Stavros Logarides, as members of the legendary rock group Poll, created a music wave which met with great success and took the music scene of Athens under the colonels by storm. Their music resonated with the young and created songs which still remain in the history of Greek rock.

His 1972 progressive-psychedelic solo album, rock opera Aperanta Horafia (Infinite Fields), is considered a landmark of Greek rock and an act of resistance against the junta which ruled Greece at the time.

His songs often deal with Space and Time and one of his greatest hits from his album Astroneira (Star Dreams) was I Michani Tou Chronou (The Machine of Time). He participated in the rock opera Trojan War composed by Yannis Petritsis along with Robert Williams and other Greek rock stars.

His anti-war protest song  Anthrope Αgapa (Humankind Love Each Other) as a member of Poll along with his solo albums Astroneira and Kyries kai Kyrioi were among the biggest hits of the '70s in Greece. Tournas was included in the electoral list of New Democracy in 2011. In 2013, he was a candidate of ND for the European Parliament.

Early life
Tournas was born in 1949, in Tripoli, Greece. As a child he enjoyed singing Greek melodies of the era. Due to financial difficulties, his family eventually moved to Kypseli, Athens. Tournas managed to finish high school and in his spare time he used to study playing the guitar which he received as present from his mother.

Music career
In Athens, Tournas worked at various music clubs in playing Italian and French songs which he did not enjoy very much because he found them melodramatic. He was a Beatles fan to the point of having watched  Α Hard Day's Night seven times in a single day.  He also enjoyed listening to the Rolling Stones and Crosby, Stills, Nash & Young.

Poll

After returning from the army, Tournas founded Poll, one of the first rock groups of Greece, along with his childhood friend Robert Williams and Stavros Logarides. The motto of their group was Poll is love and their logo was the stylised outline of a dove. In a concert with Poll, in their first ever photographic event, at the Pedion tou Areos Tournas played guitar, sitar, flute and the piano. Poll started appearing at the popular Athens music club Kyttaro presenting folk rock songs influenced from the hippie culture which soon became very popular among the youth.

Their first album Anthrope... (Humankind...) included the song  Anthrope agapa (Mankind Love Each Other) which became a huge success and came in a fashionable gunny sack. Anthrope agapa is considered the first protest anti-war song in the history of Greek rock. Other hits from the same album included  Poll Means Love, Έλα Ήλιε μου (Come My Sun), Στην Πηγή μια Κοπέλα (A Girl at the Fountain), Αετοί (Eagles) and Η Γενιά μας (Our Generation).

It was followed by their second album Lefko (White) which was influenced by the Beatles' White Album. Poll dissolved soon after their second album. The group broke up because Tournas wanted to pursue a solo career. When asked about the reasons of the breakup Tournas commented that sometimes a group is like a partnership and when the reasons for its existence are no longer there then it breaks up.

Later career
Following Poll, in 1972 Tournas composed Aperanta Horafia, a 40-minute psychedelic pop-rock symphonic work which he presented with the group Ruth. The work featured the participation of a symphonic orchestra. Tournas was inspired by Beethoven for this work. Aperanta Horafia sold just 2500 records at the time. During the subsequent 39 years, multiple editions of the record have sold-out. On the 40th anniversary of the album, Tournas performed a concert featuring the work with the participation of the Orchestra of Modern Music of ERT under the direction of Stathis Soulis at the theatre of the cultural centre Hellenic World.

Tournas' career took off in the '70s and in subsequent decades he produced several other hits. In 1973, influenced by David Bowie's Ziggy Stardust, he created Astronira (Star Dreams). His songs often deal with Space and Time and one of his greatest hits from his album Astronira (Star Dreams) was I Michani Tou Chronou (The Machine of Time), a song about how Time, like a machine, changes everyone and everything. He participated in the rock opera Trojan War composed by Yannis Petritsis along with Robert Williams and other Greek stars such as Marina, Giorgos Moutsios and Charlie.

He appeared also in several television broadcasts and live performances in Greece and Cyprus. In 1973, Tournas along with Greek rock-pop idols Elpida, Marina, and Robert Williams gave a performance at the Open-Air Theatre in Cyprus which attracted thousands. The Dance orchestra of ERT also performed at the same event. His night concerts have been praised as "reviving a whole era" with his songs which "have written a part of the pop-history" of Greece from the era of Poll to the present day. His Italo disco album Fantasia 85 has been praised by an Italian music critic.

Guitars
Over the years Tournas used the following guitars.
Takamine 
Gibson SG
Fender Stratocaster

Discography
This is a partial list of Tournas' discography:

References

1949 births
Living people
Greek composers
Greek rock singers
Greek pop singers
Greek rock guitarists
People from Tripoli, Greece
Greek junta
New Democracy (Greece) politicians